Big Brother Africa 2 was the second series of the reality television show Big Brother Africa, produced by Endemol. The season began airing on 5 August 2007 and ran 98 days ending 11 November 2007.

As with the previous season, the show involved 12 countries within Africa (Angola, Botswana, Ghana, Kenya, Malawi, Namibia, Nigeria, South Africa, Tanzania, Uganda, Zambia and Zimbabwe) each producing a contestant living in an isolated house in Johanneburg, South Africa, while trying to avoid being evicted by viewers and ultimately winning a large cash prize at the end of the show. The show was filmed in a house at Sasani Studios in Lyndhurst, Johannesburg.

Production

The House
Measuring 280 m2, the Big Brother House was significantly transformed from the first season's House. With a lot more eccentric and bold colours with a fusion of Afro-plush, the House boasted two bedrooms – for the guys and girls – a fully equipped kitchen, a communal bathroom, a dining area, a lounge, a backyard with a Jacuzzi, a Diary Room where Housemates were strongly encouraged to voice their true thoughts and feelings, and a Store Room where most of the Housemates' belongings were kept.

Nominations
Each week housemates nominate two other housemates for eviction in the Diary Room and must give justified and clear reasons. The Head of House may be nominated for eviction as well. After the nominees are revealed to the House, the current Head of House can save a nominee for eviction including themselves if they are nominated and replace the saved nominee with another nominee. While this is revealed to the viewers, the House does not know of the decision until eviction night Sunday.

Head of House
The Head of House (or HOH) is a position in the house that gives one housemate each week special privileges over the other Housemates. It is a power similar to both the Head of Household and the Power of Veto used in the American version of Big Brother. During nominations the Head of House can be nominated for eviction by their fellow housemates. Then the Head of House can choose to save a nominee or save themselves from eviction and nominate a new housemate for eviction. While the decision is released to the public, the House will not know of the decision until Sunday, eviction night.

Rules and regulations
Of contention is also the continued enforcing and later breaking of regulations, such as the imposition of a uniform that was later withdrawn, and subsequent bans against smoking and excessive alcohol consumption that were also later withdrawn with the provision of a shopping list service where the housemates could order whatever they wanted.

Product placement
The continued interruption of the live broadcast to advertise the show's sponsors has also been questioned.

Nomination procedure
The change of the nomination procedure to involve a veto by the head of house has also been questioned, especially since the veto could be abused for personal reasons.

Housemates

Bertha
Bertha Zakeyo (born June 2, 1979) is a lawyer from Harare, Zimbabwe. She was the sixth housemate to be evicted from the show, after receiving 12 of 13 votes on Day 63.

Code
Code Sangala (born June 2, 1976) is a radio DJ and musician from Blantyre, Malawi. He became the eighth housemate to be evicted with 10 of the 13 votes on Day 77.

In 2010 Code competed in Big Brother Africa 5: All Stars and lasted 77 days.  He has spent a combined 154 days in the Big Brother house.

Jeff
Jeff Kariaga (born November 21, 1983) is an entrepreneur from Kisumu, Kenya. He became the second person to be evicted after receiving 7 of 13 votes on Day 28.

Justice
Justice Motlhabani (born January 17, 1984) graduated with a bachelor's degree in Public Relations and Print Journalism from the University of Botswana. He hails from Midikwana Ward in Serowe, Botswana. Justice was the first person to be evicted from the Big Brother Africa house after receiving 7 of 13 votes. He is a proponent of argumentation, rhetoric and debate
In 2011 he convened the World Universities Debating Championship. In 2013 he published a book about his 21 days experience in the Big Brother House title "Why I Didn't Kiss Tatiana: 21 Days in the Big Brother Africa House".

Kwaku
Kwaku Asamoah Tutu (born 1 June 1977) is from Kumawu, Ghana. He was the seventh evictee from the house with 11 out of the 13 votes on Day 70. He was in a relationship with Meryle then with Bertha.

Lerato
Lerato Sengadi (born October 31, 1982) is an events coordinator from Soweto, South Africa. She was the fifth evictee of the series, after receiving 8 of 13 votes on Day 56.

In 2010 Lerato competed in Big Brother Africa 5: All-Stars and lasted to the final for 91 days.  She has spent a combined 147 days in the Big Brother house.

Maureen
Maureen Namatovu  (born September 5, 1979) is a fashion designer from Entebbe, Uganda.

Maxwell
Maxwell Chongu (born June 27, 1981) is a call centre operator from Lusaka, Zambia. Maxwell became the fourth housemate to be evicted with 12 of the 13 votes on Day 42.

Meryl
Meryl Shikwambane (born March 8, 1986) is a receptionist from Namibia. She was the third evictee of the series, after receiving 8 of 13 votes on Day 35.

In 2010 Meryl competed in Big Brother Africa 5: All-Stars and lasted 77 days.  She has spent a combined 112 days in the Big Brother house.

Ofunneka
Ofunneka Malokwu (born August 9, 1977) is a personal assistant from Jos, Nigeria. She celebrated her 30th birthday whilst in the Big Brother house. She was the runner-up in the series.

Richard
Richard Dyle Bezuidenhout (born August 10, 1982) is a student from Ilala, Tanzania. He was the winner of Big Brother Africa 2.

Tatiana
Tatiana Durão (born March 31, 1981) is an actress and model from Luanda, Angola. She was the 10th person to be evicted from the big brother house.  She made the final on Day 98.

In 2010 Tatiana competed in Big Brother Africa 5: All-Stars and lasted 84 days. She has spent a combined 182 days in the Big Brother house.

Nominations Table
A record of the nominations cast, stored in a nominations table, shows how each Housemate nominated other Housemates throughout his or her time in the house. The Head of House can choose to save a nominated Housemate each week and nominate another Housemate to face the public vote. Twists to the normal nominations process are noted, such as immunity from nomination and eviction (referred to as "exempt").

 - The Housemate marked in green was the Head of House for that week and was granted the Save and Replace power.

Nomination notes
: On Day 2, Housemates were asked to name 2 others that they would nominate if it were a regular Monday. These nominations did not count and no one was put up for the public vote. If there was a public vote, Justice, Lerato, and Meryl would have been nominated.
: There were no nominations or eviction for Week 2.
: As Head of House, Meryl chose to remove Bertha from the nominees and replace her with Jeff.
: As Head of House, Bertha chose to remove Meryl from the nominees and replace her with Maureen.
: As Head of House, Maxwell chose to remove Ofunneka from the nominees and replace her with Richard.
: As Head of House, Lerato chose to remove herself from the nominees and replace her with Tatiana.
: In Week 7, Big Brother reversed the nomination process by putting up the Housemates with the least nominations. As Head of House, Tatiana chose to remove herself from the nominees and replace her with Lerato. There will be a fake eviction on Sunday, the two fake evicted Housemates will have full access to the happenings in the House. Due to the fake eviction there will be no public voting in Week 7.
: As Head of House, Maureen chose to keep the nominations the same. Kwaku and Ofunneka were exempt from being nominated during Week 8.
: As Head of House, Richard chose to keep the nominations the same.
: Code, the Head of House, chose to save himself and nominate Tatiana in his place.
: As Head of House, Ofunneka chose to keep the nominations the same.
: As Head of House, Tatiana chose to keep the nominations the same.
: This week the public voted to win, rather than to evict.

Controversy
Controversy came up after second runner-up Ofunneka was sexually assaulted by Richard when all the housemates were drunk. The producers of the show deny this, stating it was with Ofunneka's consent, but fellow housemate Maureen screamed for Big Brother's help after she tried to get Richard off Ofunneka.  Richard was taken into the diary room while paramedics came in to help the girls. No further comment has been made about the issue, especially as Ofunneka had passed out and remembered nothing of what happened. (In the Australian version of the show, the male housemates who sexually assaulted a female housemate were evicted.)

Newly-wed Richard carried out an affair with Angolan model Tatiana during their stay in the house. This angered Richard's Canadian wife, who threatened him with divorce. Another housemate, Malawian radio DJ Code, managed to seduce all his female housemates. Unknown to him, his Dutch girlfriend, Juna Verheji, was pregnant with his child, and surprised him by showing up at his eviction. Richard and Code were eventually forgiven by their respective partners.

Producers were unable to deal with other issues which included bullying by South African Lerato Sengadi. Indecent sexual acts by Namibian housemate Meryl and Ghanaian Kweku were another talking point, although Meryl denies the couple had sex.
The show has been the subject of much criticism, especially from the fact that most of the items in the house are not "African" and therefore it is not really Big Brother Africa, but essentially just a Big Brother-style show with African contestants.

At the end of its run, Big Brother Africa 2 was criticized for not showing any positive values to young people all over the continent.

References

2007 television seasons
02